Motorola Solutions, Inc., is an American video equipment, telecommunications equipment, software, systems and services provider that succeeded Motorola, Inc., following the spinoff of the mobile phone division into Motorola Mobility in 2011. The company is headquartered in Chicago, Illinois.

History

Motorola Solutions began trading as a separate independent company on January 4, 2011, under the NYSE symbol MSI. In April 2011, Motorola Solutions completed the sale of its cellular infrastructure business to Nokia Siemens Networks for $975 million in cash. As part of the transaction, approximately 6,900 employees were transferred to Nokia Siemens Networks. The same month, Chinese telecommunications company Huawei and Motorola Solutions settled their intellectual property disputes.

In 2012 Motorola Solutions purchased Psion for $200 million and added it to its Enterprise business. A large majority of the Enterprise business was formerly Symbol Technologies, which Motorola, Inc. had acquired in 2007. On October 27, 2014, Motorola Solutions sold its Enterprise business to Zebra Technologies for $3.45 billion in cash. As part of the sale, approximately 4,500 Motorola Solutions employees from locations throughout the world were transferred to Zebra.

In August, 2015, the company received a $1 billion investment from the private equity firm Silver Lake Partners, enabling a stock buyback and providing Silver Lake with two board seats.

In December, 2015, the company announced that it would acquire Airwave Solutions, the UK based operator of the British public safety radio network servicing the police, fire and ambulance services across England, Scotland and Wales. The company completed the acquisition on February 19, 2016.

Beginning in March 2017, Motorola Solutions filed a series of lawsuits against China-based two-way radio manufacturer Hytera in the United States, Germany and Australia, as well as with the United States International Trade Commission (USITC). The complaints allege that Hytera is intentionally infringing on patents owned by Motorola Solutions and utilizing trade secrets stolen by three former Motorola Solutions employees who left to join Hytera. Motorola Solutions is seeking to stop Hytera from selling and importing its devices in these countries. In April 2017, the USITC announced that it had decided to institute an investigation into Hytera's trade practices.

In August 2017, Motorola Solutions announced it completed the acquisition of Kodiak Networks, a privately held provider of broadband push-to-talk (PTT) for commercial customers.

In December 2017, two-way radio manufacturer Hytera filed antitrust litigation against Motorola Solutions in alleging that Motorola is engaging in anti-competitive practices that are unlawful under the Sherman Act  and Clayton Act. Hytera's complaint alleges that Motorola Solutions prevents Hytera from competing in the U.S. marketplace by enforcing inflated prices and engaging in a monopolistic scheme that includes forcing LMR dealers to drop Hytera's products.

In March 2018, Motorola Solutions acquired Avigilon for about $1 billion.

In March 2018, Motorola Solutions acquired Plant Holdings, Inc., which holds the Airbus DS Communications business, from Airbus Defense and Space, Inc., an indirect subsidiary of Airbus SE.

In January 2019, the company acquired Livermore, California-based VaaS International Holdings, and its subsidiary, license plate reading technology company Vigilant Solutions, for $445 million.

In July 2019, the company acquired WatchGuard Inc.

In July 2020, the company acquired IndigoVision.

In August 2020, the company acquired Pelco Inc. A California-based Video Security company for $110M in cash from Transom Capital. Pelco was previously a Schneider Electric brand.

In September 2020, the company acquired Polaris Networks, a global wireless technologies solutions provider.

In July 2021, the company acquired Openpath Security Inc., a cloud-based, mobile access control provider, for an undisclosed sum.

In November 2021, the company acquired Envysion, a provider of enterprise video security and business analytics for the retail industry.

In March 2022, the company acquired Ava Security Limited, a UK-based global provider of cloud-native video security and analytics.

In April 2022, the company acquired Calipsa, a UK-based video analytics start-up. 

In May 2022, the company acquired Videotec, an Italy-based video security manufacturer. 

In August 2022, the company acquired Barrett Communications, an Australia-based HF/VHF communications systems provider. 

In December 2022, the company acquired Rave Mobile Safety, a Massachusetts-based public safety mass notification and incident management cloud platform.

Products 
 

Motorola Solutions manufactures two-way radios and public safety radio systems for first-responders and law enforcement. It also provides software packages for command centers, mapping and drone surveillance. Apart from radios, it manufactures body cameras, the Watchguard Video brand for law enforcement, while others geared more towards private business and security surveillance under the Avigilon brand. On 3 August MSI acquired California based Video Security brand Pelco for US$110M in cash. With this acquisition Motorola Solutions now has 3 Video Security brands under the Video Security and Analytics business. Avigilon, Pelco and IndigoVision 

Motorola also manufactures push to talk LTE devices under the LTE LEX line. The LEX series runs on Android.

Controversies
In August 2021, Motorola Solutions filed a 52-page complaint against Verkada with the United States International Trade Commission, alleging that Verkada cameras and software infringe upon patents held by Motorola subsidiary Avigilon. Verkada subsequently filed a lawsuit against Motorola Solutions in the California Northern District Court in September 2021, arguing that Motorola has "sought to effectively shut Verkada’s business down". Later in September, the International Trade Commission initiated its investigation into Motorola's complaint, with Verkada stating in its response that it does not infringe upon any of Motorola's patents.

Involvement in Israeli settlements

On 12 February 2020, the United Nations published a database of all business enterprises involved in certain specified activities related to the Israeli settlements in the Occupied Palestinian Territories, including East Jerusalem, and in the occupied Golan Heights. Motorola Solutions Inc. and its subsidiary company, Motorola Solutions Israel Ltd., have been listed on the database in light of their involvement in activities related to "the  supply  of  surveillance  and  identification  equipment  for  settlements, 
the wall and checkpoints directly linked with settlements". The international community considers Israeli settlements built on land occupied by Israel to be in violation of international law.

On 5 July 2021, Norway's largest pension fund KLP said it would divest from Motorola Solutions, together with 15 other business entities implicated in the UN report for their links to Israeli settlements in the occupied West Bank, saying it was "a very straightforward decision" given the use of the company's video security and software in border surveillance.

See also
 Astro (Motorola)
 Dimetra

References

External links
 

2011 establishments in Illinois
American brands
American companies established in 2011
Electronics companies established in 2011
Manufacturing companies based in Chicago
Corporate spin-offs
Companies listed on the New York Stock Exchange
Networking companies of the United States
Radio-frequency identification companies
Schaumburg, Illinois
Silver Lake (investment firm) companies
Telecommunications companies established in 2011
Telecommunications equipment vendors